Victor Öhman (born July 1, 1995) is a Swedish ice hockey player. He is currently playing with Sparta Warriors of the GET-ligaen (GET).

Öhman made his Swedish Hockey League debut playing with Modo Hockey during the 2012–13 SHL season.

References

External links

1995 births
IF Björklöven players
IK Oskarshamn players
Living people
Modo Hockey players
Sparta Warriors players
Swedish ice hockey forwards
Västerviks IK players
People from Örnsköldsvik Municipality
Sportspeople from Västernorrland County